Mahaprabhu is a Sanskrit-language honorific. It may refer to:

Jagannath
Vallabha (1479–1531), founder of the Pushtimarg sect
Chaitanya Mahaprabhu (1486–1534), founder of the Bengali Gaudiya Vaishnavite school of Hinduism
Hith Harivansh Mahaprabhu (1509–1552), founder of the Radha Vallabh Sampradaya
Mahāprabhu, chief god of the Bonda people of Orissa, India
Mahaprabhu (film), a 1996 Indian Tamil-language masala film
Mahaprabhu (TV series), a Bengali TV series